The Parliamentary Advisory Council for Transport Safety (PACTS) is a registered charity. For much of its history, it was also an All-party parliamentary group of the UK parliament. In 2016, following changes to parliamentary rules, PACTS the charity was separated from the APPG and PACTS now provides the secretariat to the Transport Safety APPG. PACTS charitable objective is: To protect human life through the promotion of transport safety for the public benefit. Its annual accounts and trustees review of the year can be accessed via the Charity Commission’s website.

History 
PACTS was founded in the debate about the compulsory wearing of seatbelts in the fronts of cars in 1981. Its current chair, Barry Sheerman MP, was instrumental in moving an amendment to the 1981 Transport Act to ensure that seatbelt wearing became a requirement. More recently, it helped to ensure that powers to use evidential roadside breath testing equipment were made available to the police and that the police were given the power to seize uninsured vehicles through the Serious Organised Crime and Police Act 2005.

Membership 
PACTS has an annual membership of over 100 organisations and individuals. To inform its work, it brings together expertise and knowledge from the public, private and professional sectors, comprising insurers, car manufacturers, police and emergency services, local authorities, research institutions and road user groups. It seeks to use this expertise to provide independent, research-based technical advice to Parliamentarians.

Members also provide technical expertise through a structure of working parties. These look at road user behaviour, vehicle design, the road environment, aviation and rail safety. Chaired by independent and respected experts in the field, these enable PACTS to maintain its current knowledge and understanding of the issues facing transport safety.

Events 
It organises the prestigious annual Westminster Lecture on Transport Safety to help disseminate key research and knowledge about transport safety. Those invited to give the lecture have included Professor Danny Dorling (Sheffield University), Professor Oliver Carsten (Leeds University Institute for Transport Studies), Dr Jillian Anable (Aberdeen University), Professor Fred Wegman (SWOV – the Dutch road safety research institute) and Tony Bliss (Monash University Accident Research Centre).

As part of its educational work, it also organises two conferences a year, usually held in October and March. These offer an opportunity for practitioners and researchers to debate key research findings and to evaluate examples of current practice in transport safety. Recent conferences have covered driving while impaired, vehicle design innovations and aiming for zero.

Europe 
Recognising the importance of the European dimension in transport safety, PACTS was a co-founder of the European Transport Safety Council (ETSC) which is based in Brussels. This brings together representative organisations across the EU and occupies a similar position to PACTS in relation to the European Parliament and Commission. ETSC is a European (not EU) body and PACTS engagement is unaffected by brexit.

Current work 
In the summer of 2015 PACTS released its Road Safety Priorities 2015 (June 2015) setting out strategic initiatives which PACTS believes will aid in reducing death and injury on roads in the UK.

PACTS also publishes regular research reports, the most recent being Road Safety Since 2010 (September 2015), which assesses approaches to road safety since 2010 and contains recommendations to government and to transport providers to ensure that safety for all transport users is improved.

References

External links 
 Official website

Road safety
Transport Safety
Road safety in the United Kingdom